Khaled Mohamad Takaji (born 18 November 1986) is a Lebanese footballer and former futsal player who plays as a forward for  club Bourj.

Club career 
Takaji signed for Lebanese Premier League side Nejmeh's youth sector on 4 August 2000; he was promoted to the first team ahead of the 2006–07 season.

In 2008, Takaji decided to pursue a career as a futsal player, joining Pro's Cafe Beirut, with whom he played at the 2010 AFC Futsal Club Championship. He then played for Sadaka and All Sports Club at the 2011 and 2012 AFC Futsal Club Championships, respectively. 

On 23 August 2012, Takaji returned to Nejmeh. In June 2016, Takaji played at the 2016 AFC Futsal Club Championship for Mayadeen. He moved to Ansar, Nejmeh's rivals, on 3 August 2017. After one season, on 28 August 2018, Takaji joined Akhaa Ahli Aley. 

Takaji returned to Nejmeh for a second time ahead of the 2019–20 season. He renewed his contract for one year on 4 August 2020, and for another year on 1 July 2021, following the 2020–21 season where he scored four goals and made six assists. 

On 23 August 2022, Takaji signed for Bourj on a free transfer.

International career 
Takaji represented Lebanon internationally in futsal, playing at the 2007, 2008, 2010, and 2012 AFC Futsal Championships, captaining Lebanon in the last edition. With 13 goals, Takaji was the 2008 Arab Futsal Championship top scorer, and was awarded the Best Player award. He also helped Lebanon to a sixth-place finish at the 2010 Mediterranean Futsal Cup. 

Takaji also played for the Lebanon national football team in 2015, in two friendly games against Syria and Jordan, and a 2018 FIFA World Cup qualifying game against Laos.

Style of play 
A versatile forward, Takaji is capable of playing as a second striker or a winger.

Personal life 
Takaji is married to Mariam Hamadani. She gave birth to their daughter Celine on 2 October 2018.

Honours 
Nejmeh
 Lebanese Premier League: 2013–14
 Lebanese FA Cup: 2015–16, 2021–22; runner-up: 2014–15, 2020–21
 Lebanese Elite Cup: 2014, 2016, 2021; runner-up: 2013
 Lebanese Super Cup: 2014, 2016; runner-up: 2021

Individual
 Lebanese Premier League Team of the Season: 2013–14, 2014–15

References

External links

 
 
 

1986 births
Living people
Footballers from Beirut
Lebanese men's futsal players
Lebanese footballers
Futsal forwards
Association football forwards
Association football wingers
Sadaka SC futsal players
Nejmeh SC players
Al Ansar FC players
Akhaa Ahli Aley FC players
Bourj FC players
Lebanese Premier League players
Lebanon international footballers